Clube Ferroviário da Beira is a Mozambican football club based in Beira. They play in the top division in Mozambican football league Moçambola. Their home stadium is Estádio do Ferroviário. They were Moçambique Colonial Champions in 1974.

Ferroviário was founded in 1943.

Crest

Achievements
Moçambola: 1
2016.

Taça de Moçambique: 3
2005, 2013, 2014.

Performance in CAF competitions
CAF Confederation Cup: 2 appearances
2006 - First Round
2014 - First Round

CAF Cup: 1 appearance
1999 - Second Round

African Cup Winners' Cup: 1 appearance
1994 - First Round

Current squad

References

External links
Team profile - soccerway.com

Beira, Mozambique
Ferroviario da Beira
Association football clubs established in 1924
1924 establishments in Mozambique
Ferroviário da Beira